William Hartman Farmstead is a historic farmstead located at North Dansville near Dansville in Livingston County, New York. The farmstead includes a vernacular Greek Revival-style farmhouse, built about 1848–1850, and four contributing support structures all of which date from the mid- to late-19th century.  The farmhouse is a -story, roughly L-shaped frame building resting on a stone foundation and sheathed in clapboard siding.  Contributing structures are two barns, carriage house and chicken house.

It was listed on the National Register of Historic Places in 2000.

References

External links
Hartman, William, Farmstead - Dansville, New York - U.S. National Register of Historic Places on Waymarking.com

Houses on the National Register of Historic Places in New York (state)
Greek Revival houses in New York (state)
Houses completed in 1850
Houses in Livingston County, New York
National Register of Historic Places in Livingston County, New York